Circus Saran is a 1935 Austrian comedy film directed by E. W. Emo and starring Leo Slezak, Hans Moser, and Ole & Axel.

The film's sets were designed by the art director Julius von Borsody.

Cast
Leo Slezak as Direktor Saran
Hans Moser as Knox, sein Kompagnon
Georgia Holl as Lissi, dessen Tochter
Carl Schenstrøm as Clown
Harald Madsen as Clown
Rolf Wanka as Kurt von Herdegen
Adele Sandrock as Seine Großmutter
Ilona Massey as Eine Sängerin
Poldi Dur
Auguste Pünkösdy

References

External links

1935 comedy films
Austrian comedy films
Films directed by E. W. Emo
Circus films
Buddy comedy films
Austrian black-and-white films
Films scored by Robert Stolz
1930s German-language films